Prince of Wales Reach is the first arm of the Jervis Inlet and is located within the Coast Mountain Range of British Columbia, Canada. This arm was named during the 1860 survey by  who charted all of the area and was named after Albert Edward - the Prince Of Wales, later Edward VII, who was born in 1841 and was the second child of Queen Victoria and Prince Albert of England.

See also
List of fjords in Canada

References

Fjords of British Columbia
Coast of British Columbia
Sunshine Coast Regional District
New Westminster Land District
Inlets of British Columbia